Ana-Marija Begić (born January 17, 1994 in Split, Croatia) is a Croatian female basketball player.

External links
Profile at eurobasket.com
Biography at regeneracomsports.com

Living people
1994 births
Basketball players from Split, Croatia
Croatian expatriate basketball people in Spain
Croatian women's basketball players
Power forwards (basketball)
Small forwards
Croatian Women's Basketball League players